Nower Hill High School is a secondary academy school with a sixth form, in Pinner in the London Borough of Harrow. The school currently has around 300 pupils in each year group including over 400 in the Sixth form, making over 1900 pupils in the school. Pupils range from 11–19 years of age; the sixth form is part of the borough's Harrow Sixth Form Collegiate.

History 
The school, then known as Headstone School, started life in 1929 when the red brick building in Pinner Road was built.  Its "houses", commemorating famous former residents of Harrow and one historical building, were Byron, Becket, Shaftesbury and Manor.   Colours, in the order of the houses given, were Green, Blue, Red and Orange.

Nowerhill used to be a former grammar school, but converted to public in the 20th century.

In 2011 the school changed to academy status.

Crest 
The left hand side of the school's crest is based on the medieval coat of arms of Middlesex, a county of England now absorbed into London. It shows three Anglo-Saxon short notched swords or seaxes (the names 'seax' and 'Saxon' may be related).

Notable former pupils
 Simon Le Bon - Lead vocalist and lyricist of the new wave band Duran Duran and its offshoot Arcadia.

Headteachers
 Mr C.J. Boyden (September 1, 1929 - September 1, 1943)
 H.W.J. Manson (September 1, 1943 - September 1, 1963)
 Mr E.J.R. Dey (September 1, 1963 - September 1, 1969)
 Mr F.R.H. Gristwood (September 1, 1969 - September 1, 1983)
 Mr S.P. Hensby (September 1, 1983 - September 1, 1999)
 Mr H. Freed (September 1, 2000 - September 1, 2013)
 Mr C.J. Livesey (September 1, 2013 - September 1, 2019)
Ms Louise Voden (September 1, 2019 - Incumbent)

References

External links
Nower Hill High School Homepage
Harrow Council Homepage
Connexions Direct

Academies in the London Borough of Harrow
Secondary schools in the London Borough of Harrow
Educational institutions established in 1929
1929 establishments in England